A Death in White Bear Lake is a true crime book by journalist Barry Siegel, published in 1990, which recounts the murder of Dennis Jurgens.

Background
At the time Siegel worked for the Los Angeles Times as a journalist, with his focus being national news. His research included historic documents and interviews numbering in the hundreds. Andrew Vachss of The New York Times stated that the interviewees "speak more eloquently than any commentary."

Content
Vachss stated that the book does not explain the rationale for Harold being passive, while it has sufficient information on Lois Jurgens.

Vachss described the index as being useful for helping the reader with managing knowledge of the various people appearing in the book, describing it as "a professional touch".

Reception
Vachss called it "fascinating, exhaustively documented", "a work of genuine journalism", and "a work of compelling narrative force and enduring value." Vachss argued his preference for the narrative format focusing on known facts over the true crime "novelizations, where scenes and conversations are simply made up." George Johnson, in the same publication, designated the book as one of several "New & Noteworthy" books.

Carolyn Banks of The Washington Post called it "a distinguished entry in the annals of crime documentary."

Kirkus Reviews wrote that the author "doesn't spare the reader" in regards to details about events, stating that they are "ugly, horrible detail, thus even more emphatically indicting a society that looks the other way."

References

1990 non-fiction books
Non-fiction books about murders in the United States
Works about adoption
Adoption history